Gabriel Denwang Wangsu is an Indian politician and journalist.

Wangsu contested the Kanubari seat in the 2009 Arunachal Pradesh Legislative Assembly election. He stood as a People's Party of Arunachal candidate, obtaining  4,189 votes (46.30%) and finishing in second place behind the Indian National Congress leader Newlai Tingkhatra.

He again contested the Kanubari seat in the  2014 Arunachal Pradesh Legislative Assembly election, standing as an independent. He was again defeated by Tingkhatra, finishing in third place with 2,756 votes. Tingkhatra died soon after the results were declared. Wangsu stood as the Indian National Congress candidate in the 15 October 2014 by-poll to fill the vacant Kanubari seat. He was elected with 5,231 votes.

References

Living people
People's Party of Arunachal politicians
Bharatiya Janata Party politicians from Arunachal Pradesh
Arunachal Pradesh MLAs 2014–2019
Year of birth missing (living people)
People from Longding district
Naga people
Arunachal Pradesh MLAs 2019–2024